The Chinese Eastern Railway or CER (or , Kitaysko-Vostochnaya Zheleznaya Doroga or KVZhD), is the historical name for a railway system in Northeast China (also known as Manchuria).

The Russian Empire constructed the line from 1897 to 1902 using a concession from the Qing dynasty government of Imperial China. The system linked Chita with Vladivostok in the Russian Far East and with Port Arthur, then an Imperial Russian leased ice-free port. The T-shaped line consisted of three branches:

 the western branch, now the Harbin–Manzhouli Railway
 the eastern branch, now the Harbin–Suifenhe Railway
 the southern branch, now part of the Beijing–Harbin Railway

which intersected in Harbin.  Saint Petersburg administered the railway and the concession, known as the Chinese Eastern Railway Zone, from the city of Harbin, which grew into a major rail-hub.

The southern branch of the CER, known as the Japanese South Manchuria Railway from 1906, became a locus and partial casus belli for the Russo-Japanese War of 1904–1905, the 1929 Sino-Soviet Conflict, and the Second Sino-Japanese War of 1937–1945. The Soviet Union sold the railway to the Japanese puppet state of Manchukuo in 1935; later in 1945 the Soviets regained co-ownership of the railway by treaty. The Soviet Union returned the Chinese Eastern Railway to the People's Republic of China in 1952.

Name 
The official Chinese name of this railway was Great Qing Eastern Provinces Railway, also known as Eastern Qing Railway or Eastern Provinces Railway().

The southern branch was renamed to South Manchuria Railway (Japanese kyujitai/) after Japanese took over from Russians in 1905.

It is also known in English as the Chinese Far East Railway, Trans-Manchurian Railway and North Manchuria Railway.

History 

The Chinese Eastern Railway, a single-track line, provided a shortcut for the world's longest railroad, the Trans-Siberian Railway, from near the Siberian city of Chita, across northern inner Manchuria via Harbin to the Russian port of Vladivostok. This route drastically reduced the travel distance required along the originally proposed main northern route to Vladivostok, which lay completely on Russian soil but was not completed until a decade after the Manchurian "shortcut".

In 1896 China granted a construction concession through northern Inner Manchuria under the supervision of Vice Minister of Public Works Xu Jingcheng. Work on the CER began in July 1897 along the line Tarskaya (east of Chita) — Hailar — Harbin — Nikolsk-Ussuriski, and accelerated drastically after Russia concluded a 25-year lease of Liaodong from China in 1898. Officially, traffic on the line started in November 1901, but regular passenger traffic from St. Petersburg to Vladivostok across the Trans-Siberian railway did not commence until July 1903.

In 1898, construction of a 550-mile (880 km) spur line, most of which later formed the South Manchuria Railway, began at Harbin, leading southwards through Eastern Manchuria, along the Liaodong Peninsula, to the ice-free deep-water port at Lüshun, which Russia was fortifying and developing into a first-class strategic naval base and marine coaling station for its Far East Fleet and Merchant Marine. This town was known in the west as Port Arthur, and the Russo-Japanese War (1904–1905) was fought largely over who would possess this region and its excellent harbor, as well as whether it would remain open to traders of all nations (Open Door Policy).

The Chinese Eastern Railway was essentially completed in 1902, a few years earlier than the stretch around Lake Baikal. Until the Circumbaikal portion was completed (1904–1905; double-tracked, 1914), goods carried on the Trans-Siberian Railway had to be trans-shipped by ferry almost a hundred kilometers across the lake (from Port Baikal to Mysovaya).

The Chinese Eastern Railway became important in international relations. After the first Sino-Japanese War of 1894–1895, Russia gained the right to build the Chinese Eastern Railway in Manchuria. They had a large army and occupied Northern Manchuria, which was of some concern to the Japanese. Russia wanted the railway badly. It loaned money to China and promised to use the proposed railway to help defend China against Japan, in the secret Li–Lobanov Treaty of 1896.  Construction started in 1898 and was completed in 1903.

In 1900 during the Boxer Rebellion – which was suppressed by the Eight Nation Alliance including Russia – Russia also launched a separate invasion of Manchuria sending 100,000 troops to protect their interests in the railroad. During the Russo-Japanese War, Russia lost both the Liaodong Peninsula and much of the South Manchurian branch to Japan. The rail line from Changchun to Lüshun — transferred to Japanese control — became the South Manchuria Railway.

During the Russian Civil War (1917–1924) the Russian part of the CER came under the administration of the White Army. From the 1919 Karakhan Manifesto to 1927, diplomats of the Soviet Union would promise to revoke concessions in China, but the Soviets secretly kept tsarist concessions such as the Chinese Eastern Railway, as well as consulates, barracks, and Orthodox churches. This led Chiang Kai-Shek — who pushed foreign powers such as Britain to return some of their concessions from 1925 to 1927 — to turn against his former Soviet ally in 1927, seizing Soviet legations. The Soviets would later fight an armed conflict to keep control over the northern CER in the Sino-Soviet conflict of 1929. while Japan maintained control of the southern spur line.

After the establishment of Manchukuo it was known as the North Manchuria Railway until 23 March 1935, when the USSR sold its rights to the railway to the Manchukuo government; it was then merged into the Manchukuo National Railway and converted to standard gauge in four hours on 31 August.

From August 1945, the CER again came under the joint control of the USSR and China. After World War II the Soviet government insisted on occupying the Liaodong Peninsula but allowed joint control over the Southern branch with China; all this together received the name of the "Chinese Changchun Railway".

In 1952, the Soviet Union transferred (free of charge) all of its rights to the Chinese Changchun Railway to the People's Republic of China.

Flags 

The flag of the Chinese Eastern Railway is a combination of Chinese and Russian flags. It changed several times with the political changes of both owners. The first CER flag (1897–1915) was a combination of the triangular version of the flag of the Qing dynasty and the flag of Russia, with East Provinces Railway of Great Qing in Chinese. The 1915–1925 flag replaced the flag of the Qing dynasty with a triangular version of the five-colored flag, with East Provinces Railway Company of China in Chinese. The flag was changed again in 1925 and 1932, with the flag of the Soviet Union and the flag of Manchukuo added.

Trains 
The only train that covers the entire route is the train #19/20 "Vostok" (translated as "East") Moscow — Beijing. The trip from Moscow to Beijing takes 146 hours (6 days, 2 hours). The journey in the opposite direction lasts 143 hours (5 days, 23 hours).
There is also a train #653/654 Zabaikalsk — Manzhouli which one can use to cross the Russian-Chinese border. The trip takes 25 minutes.

See also

 Harbin–Manzhouli railway
 Harbin Russians
 Harbin–Suifenhe railway
 Kaiping Tramway and Imperial Railways of North China
 Russian Railway Museum, St.Petersburg
 Russian gauge
 Empire of Japan–Russian Empire relations
 History of Sino-Russian relations

References

Further reading
 Chia-pin, Liang. “History of the Chinese Eastern Railway: A Chinese Version.” Pacific Affairs 3#2 (1930), pp. 188–211, online in English translation
 Deane, Frederick. "The Chinese Eastern Railway." Foreign Affairs 3#1 (1924), pp. 147–52, online
 Elleman, Bruce A. "The Soviet Union's Secret Diplomacy Concerning the Chinese Eastern Railway, 1924–1925." Journal of Asian Studies 53.2 (1994): 459–486.
 Kantorovich, A. J. “The Sale of the Chinese Eastern Railway.” Pacific Affairs 8#4 (1935)  pp. 397–408,  online
 
 
 
 
 Wang, Chin-Chun. "The Chinese Eastern Railway." Annals of the American Academy of Political and Social Science 122.1 (1925): 57–69. online
 Wang, C. C. “The Sale of the Chinese Eastern Railway.” Foreign Affairs 12#1 (1933), pp. 57–70, online

External links

Archival collections
Guide to the Photograph Album of the Chinese Eastern Railway. Special Collections and Archives, The UC Irvine Libraries, Irvine, California. 
Views of the Chinese Eastern Railway This album contains 42 photographic prints depicting depots, railroad shops and yards, rolling stock, car interiors, tracks, health resorts, and other views along the line. Captions for the photographs are in Russian, Mandarin, and English.

Other
 Chinese Eastern Railroad Zone
 History of the line
 “The Chinese Eastern Railway – A Glimpse of History” by Peter Crush. Hong Kong Railway Society web pages: under “English, Members Corner, Feature Articles”. Retrieved January 2009

History of Manchuria
Railway lines in China
Rail transport in Siberia
Railway companies of China
Concessions in China
China–Russia relations
China–Soviet Union relations
1520 mm gauge railways in Russia
Standard gauge railways in China
Standard gauge railways in Russia
1520 mm gauge railways in China
Major National Historical and Cultural Sites in Heilongjiang